Joint Victory Campaign 2004 is the second largest 527 group in the United States by income and expenditures.  It was started by America Coming Together and The Media Fund, and its fundraising is divided between the two groups' projects.  The campaign was led by Steve Rosenthal and Harold Ickes.

Major JVC2004 contributors include George Soros, Peter B. Lewis, Steve Bing, Linda Pritzker, Dan Lewis, Agnes Varis, Herb Sandler, Marion Sandler, S. Daniel Abraham, Harold Snyder, Lewis B. Cullman, Anne Getty Earhart, Marcy Carsey, Susie Tompkins Buell, and Richard Rosenthal.

527 organizations